Claire Haigh (born 16 September 1980) is a Luxembourgish female kickboxer and mixed martial artist.

She is the former WPMF Lightweight and Super Lightweight champion, as well as the WPMF World Pro League Super Lightweight Champion. She is also the former WMC Lightweight champion. She is a two time ISKA Lightweight World title challenger.

Martial arts career
Haigh made her kickboxing debut in 2007, against Sheree Halliday, during Woking Fight Night 4. She lost a decision.

In 2009, Haigh was given the opportunity to fight for the World Professional Muaythai Federation Lightweight title, against Chantal Ughi. She won by way of TKO. Haigh fought Chantal Ughi for the World Professional Muaythai Federation Super Lightweight title in the same year, winning a decision.

Haigh defended her WPMF title in 2010, when she faced Stephanie Ielö Page, and won a unanimous decision.

Claire Haigh next fought Lanzi Estella for the KSFL World title. She would win a unanimous decision.

During Penzance Fight Night 2010: Fast And Furious, Haigh faced Julie Kitchen for the IKF World title. She lost a close split decision.

Haigh's next fight was likewise a title fight. She fought Miriam Nakamoto for the WBC Muaythai Lightweight title. Nakamoto won the bout by knockout.

Claire Haigh would then go on a six fight winning streak before challenging Angélique Pitiot for the ISKA World Lightweight title. During this winning streak, she defended her lightweight title twice, against Kwanta Soonkeeranakornsree, and against Nilawan Techasuep. Pitiot won by knockout.

She fought and defeated Nong Nan Jor Nguan in 2012 for the WMC World Lightweight title in 2012.

Championships and accomplishments
World Professional Muaythai Federation
WPMF World Lightweight Championship (135 lbs)
Two successful title defenses
WPMF World Super Lightweight Championship (140 lbs)
WPMF World Pro League Super Lightweight Championship (140 lbs)
World Muaythai Council
WMC World Lightweight Championship (135 lbs)

Kickboxing record

|- style="background:#cfc;"
|
| style="text-align:center;"|Win
| Marlene Caneva
| 
|  France
| style="text-align:center;"|KO
|align=center|5
|align=center|
| style="text-align:center;"|
|-
|- style="background:#fdd;"
|
| style="text-align:center;"|Loss
| Anke Van Gestel
|Kings of Muay Thaï 5
| Luxembourg
| style="text-align:center;"|Decision (unanimous)
|align=center|5
|align=center|3:00
| style="text-align:center;"|
|-
! style=background:white colspan=9 |
|- style="background:#cfc;"
|
| style="text-align:center;"|Win
| Saida Atmani
|Kings of Muay Thai 4
| Luxembourg
| style="text-align:center;"|TKO
|align=center|4
|align=center|
| style="text-align:center;"|
|-
|- style="background:#fdd;"
|
| style="text-align:center;"|Loss
| Veronica Vernocchi
|Fighter’s Legion
| Luxembourg
| style="text-align:center;"|Decision (split)
|align=center|3
|align=center|3:00
| style="text-align:center;"|
|-
|- style="background:#cfc;"
|
| style="text-align:center;"|Win
| Laetitia Bakissy
|One versus One 
| Trappes, France
| style="text-align:center;"|Points
|align=center|5
|align=center|3:00
| style="text-align:center;"|
|-
|- style="background:#cfc;"
|
| style="text-align:center;"|Win
| Hatice Ozyurt
|No Pain, No Muay Thai, Belgium
| Andenne, Belgium
| style="text-align:center;"|TKO
|align=center|
|align=center|
| style="text-align:center;"|
|-
|- style="background:#cfc;"
|
| style="text-align:center;"|Win
| Marlene Caneva
|Kings of Muay Thai 3
|  Luxembourg
| style="text-align:center;"|KO
|align=center|5
|align=center|
| style="text-align:center;"|
|-
|- style="background:#fdd;"
|
| style="text-align:center;"|Loss
| Angélique Pitiot
|Tower Muay Thai
| Paris, France
| style="text-align:center;"|KO
|align=center|1
|align=center|
| style="text-align:center;"|
|-
! style=background:white colspan=9 |
|- style="background:#cfc;"
|
| style="text-align:center;"|Win
| Saida Atmani
|Fight Fever 5th Edition
| Longeville-lès-Metz, France
| style="text-align:center;"|TKO
|align=center|
|align=center|
| style="text-align:center;"|
|-
|- style="background:#cfc;"
|
| style="text-align:center;"|Win
| Roxana Gaal
|Fight Fever 5th Edition
| Luxembourg
| style="text-align:center;"|TKO
|align=center|3
|align=center|
| style="text-align:center;"|
|-
|- style="background:#cfc;"
|
| style="text-align:center;"|Win
| Sandra Pires
|Kings of Muay Thai 2
|  Oberkorn, Luxembourg
| style="text-align:center;"|TKO
|align=center|3
|align=center|
| style="text-align:center;"|
|-
! style=background:white colspan=9 |
|- style="background:#cfc;"
|
| style="text-align:center;"|Win
| Nilawan Techasuep
|WPMF World Championship
|  Bali, Indonesia
| style="text-align:center;"|Points
|align=center|5
|align=center|3:00
| style="text-align:center;"|
|-
! style=background:white colspan=9 |
|- style="background:#cfc;"
|
| style="text-align:center;"|Win
| Kwanta Soonkeeranakornsree 
|WPMF World Championship
| Phuket, Thailand
| style="text-align:center;"|TKO
|align=center|4
|align=center|
| style="text-align:center;"|
|-
! style=background:white colspan=9 |
|- style="background:#cfc;"
|
| style="text-align:center;"|Win
| 
| 
| Phuket, Thailand
| style="text-align:center;"|Points
|align=center|3
|align=center|2:00
| style="text-align:center;"|
|-
|- style="background:#fdd;"
|
| style="text-align:center;"|Loss
| Miriam Nakamoto
|WCK Muay Thai The Top Best
| Haikou City, Hainan Island, China
| style="text-align:center;"|KO
|align=center|1
|align=center|
| style="text-align:center;"|
|-
! style=background:white colspan=9 |
|- style="background:#fdd;"
|
| style="text-align:center;"|Loss
| Julie Kitchen
| 
| Cornwall, England
| style="text-align:center;"|Decision (split)
|align=center|3
|align=center|3:00
| style="text-align:center;"|
|-
! style=background:white colspan=9 |
|- style="background:#c5d2ea;"
|
| style="text-align:center;"|Draw
| Amanda Kelly
|Muay Thai Addicts III
| London, England
| style="text-align:center;"|Draw (unanimous)
|align=center|3
|align=center|3:00
| style="text-align:center;"|
|-
|- style="background:#cfc;"
|
| style="text-align:center;"|Win
| Lanzi Estella
|Gala KSFL
| Luxembourg
| style="text-align:center;"|Decision
|align=center|5
|align=center|2:00
| style="text-align:center;"|
|-
! style=background:white colspan=9 |
|- style="background:#cfc;"
|
| style="text-align:center;"|Win
| Stephanie Ielö Page
|WPMF World Championship
|  Saphan Buri Stadium, Thailand
| style="text-align:center;"|Decision
|align=center|3
|align=center|3:00
| style="text-align:center;"|
|-
! style=background:white colspan=9 |
|- style="background:#fdd;"
|
| style="text-align:center;"|Loss
| Julie Kitchen
|Kings Cup Tournament
| Bangkok, Thailand
| style="text-align:center;"|Points
|align=center|3
|align=center|2:00
| style="text-align:center;"|
|-
|- style="background:#cfc;"
|
| style="text-align:center;"|Win
| Chantal Ughi
|Queens Birthday - Muay Thai Event
| Bangkok, Thailand
| style="text-align:center;"|TKO
|align=center|
|align=center|
| style="text-align:center;"|
|-
! style=background:white colspan=9 |
|- style="background:#cfc;"
|
| style="text-align:center;"|Win
| Ifa Onuga
|England vs Belarus
| London, England
| style="text-align:center;"|Points
|align=center|3
|align=center|2:00
| style="text-align:center;"|
|-
|- style="background:#fdd;"
|
| style="text-align:center;"|Loss
| Sheree Halliday
|Woking Fight Night 4
| Woking, England
| style="text-align:center;"|Points
|align=center|3
|align=center|2:00
| style="text-align:center;"|
|-
|-
| colspan=9 | Legend:

Mixed martial arts record

|Draw
|align=center|3–0–1
|Jin Tang
|Draw (Unanimous)
|DQ - Dragon Qilu
|
|align=center|3
|align=center|5:00
|Shandong, China
|
|-
|Win
|align=center|3–0
|Eileen Forrest
|Submission (Rear-Naked Choke
|MC - Martial Combat 12
|
|align=center|2
|align=center|2:06
|Singapore
|
|-
|Win
|align=center|2–0
|Sun Jiao
|TKO (Elbows)
|MC - Martial Combat 5
|
|align=center|3
|align=center|3:30
|Singapore
|
|-
|Win
|align=center|1–0
|Angela Rivera-Parr
|Rear-Naked Choke
|CWA - Cage Wars Australia 2
|
|align=center|1
|align=center|2:40
|Queensland, Australia
|

References

1980 births
People from Ottignies-Louvain-la-Neuve
Luxembourgian female kickboxers
Luxembourgian female mixed martial artists
Living people
Bantamweight mixed martial artists
Mixed martial artists utilizing boxing
Mixed martial artists utilizing Muay Thai
Lightweight kickboxers
Luxembourgian Muay Thai practitioners
Female Muay Thai practitioners